The British Aerospace ATP (Advanced Turbo-Prop) is an airliner designed and produced by British Aerospace. It was an evolution of the Hawker Siddeley HS 748, a fairly successful feederliner of the 1960s.

The ATP was developed during the 1980s, events such as such as the 1979 oil crisis and increasing public concern regarding aircraft noise led to business planners at British Aerospace to believe that there was a market for a short-range, low-noise, fuel-efficient turboprop aircraft. First flown on 6 August 1986, by the time it became commercially available, the market segment it fell within was already hotly contested by multiple other airliners, such as the de Havilland Canada Dash 8, ATR 42, and ATR 72. Amid this intense competition, sales of the ATP were limited, leading British Aerospace to terminate production after only eight years, during which a total of 65 aircraft were completed.

The final European operator of the ATP, West Air Sweden, made a final repositioning flight on 24 February 2023. Thus marking the end of the type’s primary active service. Some aircraft remain in service with smaller airlines but in limited quantities.

Design and development

Background
The origins of the ATP can be traced back to, in part, the 1979 oil crisis, which had caused dramatic rises in fuel prices; there was considerable attention paid to the possibility of another such event, thus operators came to place greater value on the fuel efficiency of their aircraft. Another factor that had gained prominence around this time was noise pollution. Recognising these trends, British Aerospace decided that it would assign a design team to produce an airliner, suitable for short- to medium-haul operations, that would be both more fuel efficient and quieter than the prior generations of aircraft.

It was quickly decided that a development of the existing Hawker Siddeley HS 748 airliner would be the preferred option. The airframe was redesigned with a lengthened  fuselage and a larger  wing span. the airliner was originally designed to accommodate 64 passengers, although the actual capacity could change considerably dependent on customer configuration, and was sized to slot between the original HS 748's capacity of 50 seats and the jet-powered British Aerospace 146's capacity of 100 seats. The aircraft was also designed to be compliant with the latest regulations pertaining to air travel in both Europe and the United States.

The cockpit was also redesigned to ease pilot workload using measures such as colour-coded instrumentation and a centralised fault warning panel. Equipped with digital avionics and multifunction displays, it was considered to be a glass cockpit. Various other minor modifications were performed across the airframe, such as the reshaping of areas such as the more pointed nose, the tail unit's swept fin and rudder, and revised wingtips. Furthermore, the windows were reduced in size and had a shorter pitch than those of the HS 748. There was a 30% commonality between the two aircraft.

The propulsion was significantly revised from that of the HS 748; the twin Rolls-Royce Dart turboprop engines of its predecessor were substituted for Pratt & Whitney Canada PW126 engines, a more modern counterpart. Each engine drove a custom-designed six-blade propeller jointly developed by British Aerospace and the American specialist Hamilton Standard. These large diameter propellers were designed to turn slower than traditional equivalents to generate less noise; their distance from the fuselage meant that passengers were subject to noise levels comparable to contemporary jetliners. The airliner was also relatively lightweight, weighing only 468 pounds per seat, which was reportedly less than any other regional airliner in its size category in the mid-1980s. Partially as a result of these refinements, the aircraft's cruise speed was increased considerably over that of its predecessor. The project's existence was revealed to the public in early 1984.

Into flight
On 6 August 1986, the prototype ATP performed its maiden flight from Manchester Airport, flown by test pilot Robby Robinson. This initial flight, which lasted several hours, was relatively non-notable, except for adverse weather conditions being present for the type's first landing. At the time of this first flight, the company expected the ATP to enter revenue service during 1987.

Between 1987 and 2002, BAe reportedly held ambitions to sell around 300 ATPs. It proved to be far more economic than preceding aircraft used for the role, such as the BAC 1-11 and the Douglas DC9 jetliners. However, throughout the ATP's production run, the regional airline market was hotly contested by numerous companies, including the Dutch aircraft company Fokker, Canadian transport manufacturer Bombardier, and the European specialist ATR. This led to BAe investigating potential partnerships amongst its competitors, ultimately resulting in the short-lived merger of its regional airliner manufacturing division with ATR under the name Aero International (Regional) on 26 January 1995.

Assembly of the type was largely undertaken at BAe's Woodford and Prestwick facilities, while the manufacture of both the airframe and wings was performed at the Chadderton plant. During mid 1997, BAe announced that production of the ATP was permanently terminated; work at the Prestwick was promptly shifted to the aerostructures sector. By this point, a total of 65 aircraft had been completed.

During July 2000, a project was announced that resulted in the conversion of existing aircraft into the ATP Freighter (ATPF) configuration, which was promoted to cargo operators. Outfitted with a modified freight door derived from that of the HS 748, the ATPF can carry 30% more cargo than its predecessor with a 10% increase in running costs. Under this programme, an initial batch of six ATPs were converted into freighter on behalf of the cargo airline West Air Sweden.

Operational history

During 1988, the ATP entered commercial service with the regional airline British Midland. Numerous British airliners were quick to adopt and operate the type, including British Airways, Loganair, and British Regional Airlines. During the 1990s, various charter operators also adopted small fleets of ATPs. The air ferry company British World Airlines also opted to acquire several ATPs in a quick change configuration.

During the late 1990s, the Scandinavian airline Sun-Air initiated a long-term plan to introduce jet-powered airliners into its fleet by 2000; as a step towards this, and to help handle increasing passenger traffic on its routes between Denmark and Britain, the company acquired a pair of second-hand ATPs during late 1997; further aircraft would follow. Around the same timeframe, the Spanish operator Air Europa Express became a sizable user of the type; in August 1998, it announced its intention to double its ATP fleet from six to 12 aircraft.

Early sales efforts had been particularly focused on the North American market, BAE reportedly held negotiations with numerous carriers across the continent; the first success was an order for five ATPs from the Canadian carrier Avline. In September 1987, the American operator Wings West Airlines announced that it had picked the ATP as the winner of an international competition; the initial order for 10 airliners represented the ATP's breakthrough into the lucrative US market. Carl Albert, President and Chief Executive of Wings West, stated that the ATP was superior to its closest competitors, such as the De Havilland Canada Dash 8 and the Fokker 50, and claimed it offered the lowest seat-mile costs of any turboprop airliner. In practice, the only U.S. operator of the ATP in scheduled passenger service was Air Wisconsin, which flew as United Express on behalf of United Airlines via a code sharing agreement.

During the mid-2000s, the ATP was being increasingly used to carry aerial freight with numerous operators. By December 2021, 12 aircraft reportedly remained in commercial service as cargo aircraft with West Air Sweden (10) and Deraya (2).

Variants
Several ATP variants were proposed and produced for civil and military use:
Jetstream 61
The British Aerospace Jetstream 61 was an improved derivative of the ATP. It featured an interior based on the Jetstream 41, with innovative cabin wall armrests and an increase in capacity from 64 to 70 seats. In addition, the airframe incorporated more powerful PW127 engines and increased weights and range.

For Farnborough, the original prototype ATP (serial number 2001) was re-painted in a J61 scheme and re-registered G-PLXI (LXI being the Roman numeral for 61. The first flight of a proper J61 aircraft was by 2064 G-JLXI on 10 May 1994 from Prestwick. Four airframes were produced as Jetstream 61s, 2065 being the only other to have flown before British Aerospace's regional airliner manufacturing operations were merged with ATR as Aero International (Regional) on 26 January 1995. With the already highly successful ATR 72 now part of the same product range, the Jetstream 61 was immediately cancelled with all four airframes being scrapped at Prestwick.

Maritime ATP
This was a variant for use in military naval operations, with a surveillance radar under the forward fuselage, nose-mounted FLIR and internal sonar buoys. A suite of special crew stations also featured, as did a choice of up to six weapon pylons under the wings and fuselage. The Maritime ATP was later known as the BAe P.132. None were built.

ATP-AEW
The AEW was a 1986 proposal for an Airborne Early Warning aircraft for Australia, with two EMI Skymaster radars in nose and tail radomes, similar in appearance to the Nimrod AEW.3. None were built.

Operators

Current operators
 Encomm Airlines (Kenya, 2018-present)
Currently operate 3 known aircraft. However, limited information is known of this airline.

Former operators

 Air Europa Express (Spain, 1998–2001)
 Airgo Airlines (Greece, 2008–2010)
 Air Wisconsin (operating as United Express) (United States, 1990–1993)
 Asian Spirit (Philippines, 2003–2008)
 Biman Bangladesh Airlines
 British Airways
 British Midland
 British World Airlines
 Canarias Regional Air
 Deraya Air Taxi
 EuroAir
 Eurodirect
 First Flight Couriers (India, 2006–2007)
 Loganair
 Manx Airlines
 Merpati Nusantara Airlines
 NextJet
 SATA Air Açores
 Sun Air of Scandinavia
 Air Europa
 United Express
 Operated by Air Wisconsin
 Operated by United Feeder Service (UFS)
West Air Sweden (Sweden, 2000-2023)
West Atlantic – Cargo Airlines

Notable accidents and incidents
 On 19 April 1997, Merpati Nusantara Airlines Flight 106 lost control at 2,000 feet on approach to Tanjung Pandan Airport in Indonesia. 15 people died and 43 survived, making it the second-worst accident involving an ATP. It was the first fatal incident involving the type within its first ten years of service.
 On 11 December 1999, SATA Air Açores Flight 530 crashed into a mountain on São Jorge Island in the Azores, Portugal during a short haul flight. All 35 passengers and crew on board died in the crash. The accident was the worst air accident involving the ATP. It was confirmed that the crew got disorientated in the midst of low clouds over São Jorge Island and made a controlled flight into terrain.

Specifications

See also

References

Citations

Bibliography
 
 
 
 
 
 

ATP
1980s British airliners
Twin-turboprop tractor aircraft
Aircraft first flown in 1986
Low-wing aircraft